HMY Anne was an English royal yacht, built in 1661 at Woolwich by Christopher Pett for the Royal Navy.

References 

1660s ships
Royal Yachts of the Kingdom of England